Walton Place may refer to:

 Walton Place (Atlanta), a 1907 building in Atlanta, Georgia
 Walton Place, California, a former settlement in Los Angeles County, California
 Walton Place, London, a street in Knightsbridge, London